Worker centers are non-profit community-based mediating organizations that organize and provide support to communities of low wage workers who are not already members of a collective bargaining organization (such as a trade union) or have been legally excluded from coverage by U.S. labor laws. Many worker centers in the United States focus on immigrant and low-wage workers in sectors such as restaurant, construction, day labor and agriculture.

Purpose
Worker centers are non-profit institutions based in the community and led by their worker-members, which deliver support to low earning workers. In order to best assist in improving working conditions and necessary wages, many centers include services such as English language instruction, help with unpaid wage claims, access to health care, leadership development, educational activities, advocacy and organization. Many centers also take the role as defender of rights for immigrants in their communities.

Effects
Day Laborer Worker Centers—Worker centers support employment of day laborers in three primary ways. First, they provide a minimum wage rate. Second, they supply a distribution process for job opportunities, and third, they maintain wage standards through their support to workers victimized through wage withholding from employers.

Other Worker Centers—Worker centers that are not specific to a type of worker such as a day laborer can perform support their worker members in a wide variety of ways.  Many centers offer workers rights & immigrant rights trainings. They will also address specific workplace grievances of their worker members and use the legal system, community pressure and workplace organizing to change conditions.

Origins of worker centers
According to Janice Fine's study, worker centers developed in three stages.

The first worker centers emerged in the late 1970s and early 1980s, founded by black worker activists in North Carolina and South Carolina, immigrant activists in New York City’s Chinatown, the Texas–Mexico Border in El Paso, in San Francisco among Chinese immigrants. They grew out of a response to neoliberal policies that resulted in declining working conditions in manufacturing, factory closings and an increase in low wage service sector jobs. Worker centers were also created in reaction to “disparities of pay and treatment between African American and white workers as well as exploitation within ethnic economic enclaves and in the broader economic (including informal sector) were also major catalysts”.

From the late 1980s to early 1990s, the second wave of worker centers appeared as large groups of new Latino immigrants, some fleeing civil wars in Central America, arrived in suburban and urban regions, as well as Southeast Asians immigrants, all searching for economic opportunities. These worker centers were established by numerous individuals and institutions such as "churches and other faith-based organizations, social service and legal aid agencies, immigrant nongovernmental organizations (NGOs), and unions."

The last wave of worker centers began in 2000 to the present. Many worker centers are expanding not only in the city, but into the suburbs, rural regions, and southern states where there is a large concentration of Mexican and Central immigrants working in the poultry, service, agriculture, and meat-packing sectors. Not only that, more worker centers are emerging among Korean, Filipino, South Asian and African immigrants, and they have a higher connection to faith-based organizations and unions.

Features of worker centers
What is unique about worker centers, and makes them unlike unions, is that they operate outside of the National Labor Relations Act (NLRA) and therefore do not have to have a specific organizational model, strategy or structure. They emerge as “community-based mediating institutions that provide support to and organize among communities of low wage workers”. As such, they use diverse strategies, tactics and approaches to serve the needs of their individual communities.

Worker's centers are not considered labor organizations, and therefore are not restricted by the same laws under the National Labor Relations Act (NLRA) and Labor Management and Reporting Disclosure acts that govern traditional unions. The NLRA restricts primary picketing activity, bans any type of secondary activity, including pickets or boycotts, of business connected to the primary target. Worker centers, on the other hand, are allowed to picket businesses, can participate in secondary boycotts and interact with press in a way that makes them uniquely threatening to business interests.

Common features of worker centers include: a hybrid organization, providing necessary services, and engaging in advocacy; possess a broad agenda, approach the world with a global perspective, democracy-building, they build coalitions and have small and involved memberships. Though the vision of most worker centers is change on a systemic scale, they do meet and bargain with individual employers to improve conditions for workers. These meetings will often happen even if only a few workers in a workplace are involved. Under Section 7 of the NLRA, employees have "the right to self-organization, to form, join, or assist labor organizations, to bargain collectively through representatives of their own choosing, and to engage in other concerted activities for the purpose of collective bargaining or other mutual aid or protection." Mutual aid or protection has been broadly interpreted to include any action (excluding criminal actions) that workers take in response to any of change in the workplace that has to do with the conditions of employment, not simply those covered by employment law. This means that even a few worker members of a worker center have the right to challenge their employers regarding working conditions and not be terminated as a result. This coverage allows great flexibility for worker centers to address everything from stolen wages and hourly pay to conditions such as high temperatures in warehouses or widespread sexual harassment in a workplace.

Despite diverse strategies, most centers do similar types of work. This includes helping workers combat wage theft through filings claims, collaborating with governmental agencies to assure enforcement of labor laws and wage theft claims, launching "direct action campaigns against specific employers and sometimes across particular industries, and engaging in leadership development and popular education." Since they define themselves as dedicated to systemic change, many worker centers also play a role as policy partners in passing laws such as a higher minimum wage, mandatory paid sick days, and domestic workers bill of rights. Their worker base mobilizes not just in actions against individual employers but in broader social movements such as immigrant rights actions.

Some centers are founded by previous union organizers, or have affiliations with unions, however, as previously stated, they are not unions. Worker centers exist to meet the demand for services that unions could or would not give.  Many worker centers are established for immigrant and minority groups that work jobs where they are left out of the formal labor market and do not have the right to NLRA protection, such as day laborers, domestic workers and agricultural workers.  Others have organized around groups, such as restaurant workers (Fight for 15, ROC United), that traditional unions have ignored as being too difficult to organize.  In order to establish a union in a workplace, the union must get union cards from at least half the workers or have a majority vote for the union in an election.  This is a great challenge in workplaces such as fast food jobs that suffer from high turnover, or in industries such as contracted cleaning companies, where even figuring out the number of employees and where they are located can be extremely difficult.

Networks
Nationally, there exist at least four networks that link worker centers together:

1. The National Day Laborer Organizing Network (NDLON) that works with approximately 30 day labor centers.
2. Interfaith Worker Justice (IWJ), which connects 34 worker centers that have strong ties to religious communities.
3. National Black Worker Centers (NBWC), which connects a network of Black Worker Centers focused on issues affecting Black working people in their communities.
4. The Food Chain Workers Alliance has 17 members, 12 of which are workers centers that work with workers in the entire food system. The workers are included in the following core food industries: production, processing, distribution, retail, and service.

In August 2006, NDLON announced a new partnership with the AFL–CIO: "The AFL–CIO and NDLON will work together for state and local enforcement of rights as well as the development of new protections in areas including wage and hour laws, health and safety regulations, immigrants' rights and employee misclassification. They will also work together for comprehensive immigration reform that supports workplace rights and includes a path to citizenship and political equality for immigrant workers – and against punitive, anti-immigrant, anti-worker legislation."

This partnership stemmed from the AFL–CIO's decision to embrace immigrant workers, a change from the federation's policies in the 1980s and 1990s.

Notes

References
 "AFL-CIO & NDLON Enter Watershed Agreement to Improve Conditions for Working Families." Press release. National Day Laborer Organizing Network. August 9, 2006.
 Fine, Janice. Worker Centers: Organizing Communities at the Edge of the Dream. Ithaca, N.Y.: Cornell University Press, 2006. 
 Fine, Janice. "Worker Centers: Organizing Communities at the Edge of the Dream." EPI Briefing Paper #159. December 14, 2005.
 Gordon, Jennifer. "Immigrants Fight the Power: Workers Centers Are One Path to Labor Organizing and Political Participation." The Nation. January 3, 2000.
 Hollens, Mary. "Workers Center: Organizing in Both the Workplace and Community." Labor Notes. September 1994.
 Levine, David. "New York Workers' Centers: Creative Response to Growth of Modern Day Sweatshops." Independent Politics. July/August 1995.
 Ten Eyck, Tiffany. "Workers Centers Increasingly Are Forging Alliances with Unions." Labor Notes. January 2007.
 The Food Chain Workers Alliance. "The Hands That Feed Us: Challenges and Opportunities for Workers Along the Food Chain." June 6, 2012.

External links
 InterFaith Worker Justice
 National Day Labor Organizing Network
 The Food Chain Workers Alliance

Non-profit organizations based in the United States
Labor relations
Activism
Community organizing
Workers' rights organizations